Róbert Gál (born March 30, 1979 in Budapest) is a Hungarian artistic gymnast. He is the 2005 World bronze medalist on the floor exercise. He represented Hungary at the 2004 Summer Olympics, where he placed 6th in the vault event final.

He has been named to the 2008 Hungarian Olympic Team.

External links
 

1979 births
Living people
Hungarian male artistic gymnasts
Gymnasts from Budapest
Olympic gymnasts of Hungary
Gymnasts at the 2004 Summer Olympics
Gymnasts at the 2008 Summer Olympics
Medalists at the World Artistic Gymnastics Championships
21st-century Hungarian people